Bhawrani is a village in Jalore district of Rajasthan state, India.

History 
The village of Bhawrani was founded by the Mandlawat Rathore clan of Marwar Kingdom(Jodhpur) around 300 years ago. It is a village with lot of rich culture and amazing countryside to explore. Where as the village is located around the KOAT Bhavrani which is one of the oldest buildings. This is the home to the Thakur of Bhavrani (Thakur Pradyumna singh ji). The Kota Bhavrani holds and outstanding heritage architecture dating back to the 17th Century. It often host foreign travelers travelling from Jaisalmer to Udaipur or from Jodhpur to Udaipur. It's a horse riding safari destination in Rajasthan. Where as the village is surround by two lakes that act as a feeding ground for hundreds of Demosile Cranes which come to this region flying over the Himalayas from.  It takes 2 hours to reach from Jodhpur, approx 3 and a half hour drive from Udaipur and 6 hr from Jaisalmer.

Demographics 
Bhawrani Local Language is Marwari (Rajasthani). Bhavrani Village Total population is 7181 and number of houses are 1404. Female Population is 51.6%. Village literacy rate is 44.5% and the Female Literacy rate is 15.8%.

Villages in Jalore district